Andreas Sprecher (born 8 November 1944) is a Swiss former alpine skier who competed in the 1968 Winter Olympics and 1972 Winter Olympics.

External links
 sports-reference.com
 

1944 births
Living people
Swiss male alpine skiers
Olympic alpine skiers of Switzerland
Alpine skiers at the 1968 Winter Olympics
Alpine skiers at the 1972 Winter Olympics
Place of birth missing (living people)
20th-century Swiss people